John Joseph Duda (born March 19, 1977) is a child actor best known for starring in the Christmas movie Prancer.

Life 
John Joseph Duda was born to Deborah Sullivan and John Duda Sr. in Oak Lawn, Illinois. He has two younger siblings, Sara and Kevin. He is of Irish and Polish descent.

He graduated from St. Ignatius College Prep and Harvard University. He worked as a teacher and mentor for middle and high school, earned a doctorate in education from UCLA in 2011, and founded multiple nonprofit organizations to benefit students. 

In 2013, Johnny married Lindsey Gandy. They have two children together.

Career 
Duda's first acting role was in Eyes of an Angel, which was filmed March 14, 1988, but not released until 1991. Duda's first movie to be released was his second role, Prancer, which was filmed from February 3 to April 15, 1989. 

In Rudy, his brother Kevin played his only movie role alongside him.

Filmography

References 
1977 births
Living people
American male child actors

American male actors
20th-century American male actors
Harvard College alumni
St. Ignatius College Prep alumni
People from Oak Lawn, Illinois
Male actors from Chicago